Gurdwara Nanak Shahi is the principal Sikh Gurdwara (prayer hall) in Dhaka, Bangladesh. It is located at the campus of the University of Dhaka and considered to be the biggest of the 9 to 10 Gurdwaras in the country. The Gurudwara commemorates the visit of Guru Nanak (1506–1507). It is said to have been built in 1830. The present building of the Gurdwara was renovated in 1988–1989. The parkarma verandah had been constructed on all four sides of the original building to provide protection.

History 
The Gurudwara was built originally by Bhai Natha ji, a missionary who came to Dhaka during the time of the sixth guru. The building was completed in 1830. This Gurudwara commemorates the stay of Sri Guru Nanak Dev Ji (1469–1539). In 1988 to 1989 the building was renovated and the outside verandah was constructed for its protection and preservation with contributions received from shri guru Nanak dev ji's followers in Bangladesh and other countries. This work was carried out under the guidance of Sardar Harban Singh.

Architectural significance

This building is historic and it is one of the part of national heritage. This building is more valuable for the followers of Sikh religion. This building is the main meeting place for this religion. This is one of the part of national heritage preservation.  The care-taking is done by The Bangladesh Gurdwara Management Committee.

Present condition 
The gurudwara is in a good condition. The whole building is fully white coloured. After the renovation in 1988–1989 this building is now under good observation.

Sikh relics 
There are two hand-written Birs (Recensions) of Guru Granth Sahib in the Gurdwara, one of 18 x 12 inches with 1336 angs.

Religious rituals
Gurdwara Nanak Shahi is open for people of all religion. Each day, recitation from the holy scripture of Sikh religion Granth Sahib and prayer takes place in Gurdwara Nanak Shahi. Weekly prayer and Kirtan are organized every Friday. On this day in the morning and after prayer, free food known as langar is served.

References

 Archaeological Heritage (Page-345-346), Published By Asiatic Society Of Bangladesh, (December 2007).

External links
  Gurdwara_Nanak_Shahi_Dhaka

Gurdwaras in Bangladesh
Religious buildings and structures in Dhaka
19th-century gurdwaras
University of Dhaka